Mikerline Saint-Félix (born 18 November 1999) is a Haitian footballer who plays as a forward for French D2 Féminine club Montauban FC and the Haiti women's national team.

International career
Saint-Félix represented Haiti at the 2018 FIFA U-20 Women's World Cup.

International goals
Scores and results list Haiti's goal tally first.

References

1999 births
Living people
Women's association football forwards
Haitian women's footballers
People from Ouest (department)
Haiti women's international footballers
Haitian expatriate footballers
Haitian expatriate sportspeople in France
Expatriate women's footballers in France